The 1935 Liège–Bastogne–Liège was the 25th edition of the Liège–Bastogne–Liège cycle race and was held on 4 April 1935. The race started and finished in Liège. The race was won by Alphonse Schepers.

General classification

References

1935
1935 in Belgian sport